Chad Hanna is a 1940 American drama romance film directed by Henry King, and was adapted from a bestseller of sorts that was published that same year. The novel was written by Walter Dumaux Edmonds (after it had first been published in serial form in the Saturday Evening Post under the title "Red Wheels Rolling"). It stars Henry Fonda, Linda Darnell and Dorothy Lamour.

Plot

In the 1840s, Chad Hanna (Fonda), a New York country boy working along the canal in Canastota, New York, joins a travelling circus. He falls in love with beautiful bareback rider Albany Yates (Lamour), but she spurns him. Chad then finds himself attracted to another runaway, country girl Caroline Tridd (Darnell).

Though everybody assumes that the boy is slow on the uptake, Chad manages to save the circus from financial ruin.

Cast
 Henry Fonda as Chad Hanna
 Dorothy Lamour as Albany Yates
 Linda Darnell as Caroline 
 Guy Kibbee as Huguenine
 Jane Darwell as Mrs. Huguenine
 John Carradine as B.D. Bisbee
 Ted North as Fred Shepley
 Roscoe Ates as Ike Wayfish
 Ben Carter as Bell Boy
 Frank M. Thomas as Burke (as Frank Thomas)
 Olin Howland as Cisco Tridd
 Frank Conlan as Mr. Proudfoot
 Eddie Conrad as Fiero (as Edward Conrad)
 Edward McWade as Elias
 Edward Mundy as Joe Duddy
 George Davis as Pete Bostock
 Paul E. Burns as Budlong (as Paul Burns)
 Sarah Padden as Mrs. Tridd
 Leonard St. Leo as Mr. Pamplon (as Leonard St. Leo)
 Elizabeth Abbott as Mrs. Pamplon
 Tully Marshall as Mr. Mott 
 Almira Sessions as Mrs. Mott
 Virginia Brissac as Landlady
 Si Jenks as Farmer
 Victor Kilian as Potato Man
 Louis Mason as Constable
 Charles Middleton as Sheriff

References

External links

1940 films
1940 drama films
20th Century Fox films
American drama films
Circus films
Films based on American novels
Films directed by Henry King
Films scored by David Buttolph
Films set in New York (state)
Films set in the 1840s
1940s English-language films
1940s American films